Macellina is a genus of stick insects in the tribe Gratidiini, erected by Boris Uvarov in 1940.  Species have been recorded from China, Thailand and Vietnam (possibly incomplete distribution).

Species
The Phasmida Species File lists:
 Macellina caulodes (Rehn, 1904)
 Macellina dentata (Stål, 1875)
 Macellina digitata Chen & Wang, 1993
 Macellina nigriseta Ho, 2013
 Macellina qizhouense Ho, 2015
 Macellina souchongia (Westwood, 1859) - type species (as Bacillus souchongia Westwood)

References

External links

Phasmatodea genera
Phasmatodea of Asia
Phasmatidae